Shumerlya (Śĕmĕrle) is a town in the Chuvash Republic, Russia, located on the right bank of the Sura River on the Nizhny Novgorod–Ulyanovsk highway. Population:    35,000 (1974).

History
Founded in 1916, it was granted town status in 1937.

Administrative and municipal status
Within the framework of administrative divisions, Shumerlya serves as the administrative center of Shumerlinsky District, even though it is not a part of it. As an administrative division, it is incorporated separately as the town of republic significance of Shumerlya—an administrative unit with the status equal to that of the districts. As a municipal division, the town of republic significance of Shumerlya is incorporated as Shumerlya Urban Okrug.

Notable residents 

Serhiy Bashkyrov (born 1959), Soviet and Ukrainian football player and coach

References

Notes

Sources

Cities and towns in Chuvashia
